Lavender is a 1953 Austrian-German comedy film directed by Arthur Maria Rabenalt and starring Gretl Schörg, Karl Schönböck, and Hans Holt. It was made at the Schönbrunn Studios in Vienna. The film's sets were designed by the art director Felix Smetana.

Cast

References

External links

1953 comedy films
Austrian comedy films
German comedy films
West German films
Films directed by Arthur Maria Rabenalt
Adultery in films
Schönbrunn Studios films
Austrian black-and-white films
German black-and-white films
1950s German films